Morgan B. Williams (September 17, 1831October 13, 1903) was a coal industry executive and politician who served as a Republican member of the U.S. House of Representatives for Pennsylvania's 12th congressional district from 1897 to 1899.

Williams was born in Rhandir-Mwyn, Carmarthenshire, Wales. He attended the public schools and assisted his father in the operation of a lead mine.  When Williams was 16, his father died, and he took control of the lead mining operation.  He moved to Australia in 1856 and began gold mining.  He returned to Wales in August 1861.

He emigrated to the United States in March 1862.  He first lived in Hyde Park, Pennsylvania and worked in the coal mines until 1865 when he moved to Wilkes-Barre, Pennsylvania.  He was appointed superintendent for the Lehigh & Wilkes-Barre Coal Co., and held that position for fourteen years.  In 1878, Williams, along with George and Fred Parrish, founded the Red Ash Coal Company.  He was head of the Williams Coal Co. in Pottsville, Pennsylvania, worked as president of the Grenville Graphite Company in Canada, vice-president of the Wilkes-Barre Deposit and Savings Bank, as a director of the Spring Brook Water Supply Company and had financial interests in Vulcan Iron Works.

He was a member of the Wilkes-Barre school board and the city council for twelve years. He served as a member of the Pennsylvania State Senate for the 21st district from 1885 to 1888.  He was a member of the Chicago World’s Fair Commission in 1893.

Williams was elected as a Republican to the Fifty-fifth Congress. He was an unsuccessful candidate for reelection in 1898. He remained engaged in coal mining and died in Wilkes-Barre in 1903, aged 72.  He was interred in Hollenback Cemetery.

References

The Political Graveyard

|-

1831 births
1903 deaths
19th-century American politicians
American bankers
American businesspeople in the coal industry
American company founders
Burials in Pennsylvania
Pennsylvania city council members
Republican Party Pennsylvania state senators
People from Carmarthenshire
Politicians from Scranton, Pennsylvania
Politicians from Wilkes-Barre, Pennsylvania
Republican Party members of the United States House of Representatives from Pennsylvania
School board members in Pennsylvania
Welsh emigrants to the United States
19th-century American businesspeople